Thaddeus "Tip" McGuire is an American attorney and politician who represents northeastern Kenosha County and southeastern Racine County in the Wisconsin State Assembly.

Biography

Tip McGuire was born in Somers, Wisconsin.  He received his bachelor's degree from Marquette University in 2009, and then earned his J.D. degree from the University of Wisconsin Law School.
 
He got involved with politics shortly after graduation, working as a legislative aide to Assemblymember Peter W. Barca from 2009 through 2014, and as a campaign field organizer for the Democratic Party of Wisconsin in the 2010 and 2012 elections.

After graduating from law school, McGuire was hired as a prosecutor in the office of the Kenosha County District Attorney, and, in 2018, was hired as an Assistant District Attorney in Milwaukee County.

In 2019, Mr. Barca was nominated by Tony Evers to serve as Secretary of Revenue in the newly elected Governor's cabinet.  Barca's elevation created a vacancy in the 64th Assembly District, and, on January 22, 2019, McGuire announced that he would run for the open seat.

McGuire defeated Gina Walkington and Spencer Zimmerman in the Democratic Party primary election.  He defeated Republican Mark Stalker in the April 30th general election.

McGuire was sworn in on May 13, 2019, by Kenosha County Judge Jodi Meier.

Electoral history

| colspan="6" style="text-align:center;background-color: #e9e9e9;"| Democratic Primary, April 2, 2019

| colspan="6" style="text-align:center;background-color: #e9e9e9;"| Special Election, April 30, 2019

| colspan="6" style="text-align:center;background-color: #e9e9e9;"| General Election, November 3, 2020

Notes

External links
 
 
 Representative Tip McGuire at Wisconsin Legislature
 Official website
 Campaign website
 64th Assembly District map (2011–2021)

Democratic Party members of the Wisconsin State Assembly
Living people
People from Somers, Wisconsin
Wisconsin lawyers
Politicians from Kenosha, Wisconsin
Marquette University alumni
University of Wisconsin Law School alumni
21st-century American politicians
Year of birth missing (living people)